Clyde is an unincorporated community in Saratoga Township, Winona County, Minnesota, United States.

The community is located southeast of St. Charles, at the junction of Winona County Roads 6 and 35.

Nearby places include Utica, St. Charles, Lewiston, Fremont, Saratoga, Troy, and Lanesboro.

The former hall for Evergreen Masonic Lodge No. 46 was located at Clyde.  The remains of the country school house are also nearby.

References

Unincorporated communities in Minnesota
Unincorporated communities in Winona County, Minnesota